Eaunes is a commune in the Haute-Garonne department in southwestern France.

Population
The inhabitants of the commune are known as Eaunois or Eaunoises in French.

Twin towns
Eaunes is twinned with:
 Casier, Italy
 Albalate de Cinca, Spain

See also
Communes of the Haute-Garonne department

References

Communes of Haute-Garonne